High Survival is a Nancy Drew and Hardy Boys Supermystery crossover novel, published in 1991.

Frank, Nancy, and Joe head out to Wyoming to brave the Rocky Mountains, and the open wilderness. But Nancy becomes suspicious of all the "accidents" that have been going on in their perilous trek, and calls to the Hardys for help. The brothers respond with bad news, the trek being an open target for a local mob, a crime syndicate, and an inside man. Now, the Hardys and Nancy must work together to get the participants of the trek to safety.

References

External links
Supermystery series books

Supermystery
1991 American novels
1991 children's books
Novels set in Wyoming